Byun Young-jun ( or  ; born 20 March 1984 in Ulsan) is a South Korean racewalker. He competed in the 20 km walk at the 2012 Summer Olympics, where he placed 31st.

References

External links

1984 births
Living people
South Korean male racewalkers
Olympic athletes of South Korea
Athletes (track and field) at the 2012 Summer Olympics
Athletes (track and field) at the 2016 Summer Olympics
Sportspeople from Ulsan
World Athletics Championships athletes for South Korea